Clive Williams may refer to:

 Clive Williams (rugby union) (born 1948), Welsh rugby union player
 Clive Williams (professor) (born 1945), British-born former Australian Army Military Intelligence officer and academic